Daniel da Cruz Carvalho (born 2 November 1976), commonly known as Dani, is a Portuguese retired footballer who played mainly as an attacking midfielder.

He spent most of his eight-year professional career with Ajax after starting out at Sporting CP, appearing in nearly 100 competitive matches and winning three major titles. He also competed abroad in England with West Ham United, and in Spain with Atlético Madrid.

All youth levels comprised, Dani played 69 times for Portugal and scored 33 goals. He made his full debut in 1995.

Club career
A skilled attacking player whose career was cut short by poor professional judgment, Dani was born in Lisbon and began his career with local club Sporting CP, making his first-team debut during 1994–95 aged just 17, in a team which also included Luís Figo, Ricardo Sá Pinto and Bulgarian Krassimir Balakov, and helped the side to the season's Portuguese Cup.

In January 1996, Dani started a small loan in the Premier League with West Ham United, where he scored at Tottenham Hotspur and at home against Manchester City. Despite performing reasonably well during his tenure, his season ended when he was fired by manager Harry Redknapp when he missed training after being spotted in a nightclub.

Subsequently, Dani represented AFC Ajax, appearing regularly for the Amsterdam side but almost never as an undisputed starter. He did score an important goal in the 1996–97 UEFA Champions League quarter-final clash against Atlético Madrid, in a 3–2 away win (4–3 aggregate).

In December 2000, after a brief spell with S.L. Benfica, Dani signed for Atlético Madrid of the Spanish Segunda División, teaming up with compatriot Hugo Leal. After the Colchoneros returned to La Liga with him as an important unit, he was pretty much absent for the majority of the 2002–03 campaign and, after failing to find a new team, definitively retired from football in early 2004 at only 27.

International career
Dani earned nine caps for Portugal, the first coming on 12 December 1995 in a 1–1 friendly with England, and the last on 29 March 2000 in a 2–1 victory over Denmark (also friendly).

Previously, he appeared for the under-20 national team at the 1995 FIFA World Youth Championship in Qatar, being awarded the second place in both the Golden Boot and Golden Ball awards, and also competed at the 1996 Summer Olympics where his side finished fourth.

Personal life
Still during his playing career, Dani worked regularly as a model. After retiring, he worked in television.

Redknapp, when he was manager at West Ham, once said about the player: "Dani is so good-looking I don't know whether to play him or fuck him".

Honours
Sporting CP
Taça de Portugal: 1994–95

Ajax
Eredivisie: 1997–98
KNVB Cup: 1997–98, 1998–99

Atlético Madrid
Segunda División: 2001–02

Portugal
UEFA European Under-18 Championship: 1994
FIFA U-20 World Cup third place: 1995

Individual
FIFA U-20 World Cup Silver Ball: 1995
FIFA U-20 World Cup Bronze Boot: 1995

References

External links

1976 births
Living people
Portuguese footballers
Footballers from Lisbon
Association football midfielders
Primeira Liga players
Sporting CP footballers
S.L. Benfica footballers
Premier League players
West Ham United F.C. players
Eredivisie players
AFC Ajax players
La Liga players
Segunda División players
Atlético Madrid footballers
Portugal youth international footballers
Portugal under-21 international footballers
Portugal international footballers
Olympic footballers of Portugal
Footballers at the 1996 Summer Olympics
Portuguese expatriate footballers
Expatriate footballers in England
Expatriate footballers in the Netherlands
Expatriate footballers in Spain
Portuguese expatriate sportspeople in England
Portuguese expatriate sportspeople in the Netherlands
Portuguese expatriate sportspeople in Spain